Tazelaar is a surname. Notable people with the surname include:

Dirk Tazelaar (born 1963), Australian cricketer
Henry Tazelaar, American pathologist
Peter Tazelaar (1920–1993), Dutch World War II veteran